Ryo Okumoto (奥本亮, born May 24, 1959) is a Japanese rock keyboardist, best known for his work with American progressive rock band Spock's Beard. He joined the band in 1996 and has been a member ever since. When singer and keyboardist Neal Morse was in the band, Ryo played Hammond organ and Mellotron on the albums. Since Morse's departure, Okumoto has played all of the band's keyboard parts. He resides in Los Angeles.

Aside from his work with Spock's Beard, Okumoto has performed and recorded with numerous other artists and groups, including GPS, K², Phill Collins, Eric Clapton, and Asia featuring John Payne. For three weeks in 1998, Okumoto was a member of Eric Burdon & the New Animals, before being replaced by Martin Gerschwitz. 

Okumoto was a member of Eric Andre's house band on season 5 of the Eric Andre Show.

In 2019, Ryo joined the progressive rock supergroup cover band, ProgJect.

Discography

Spock's Beard 

 Beware Of Darkness (1996)
 The Kindness Of Strangers (1998)
 Day For Night (1999)
 V (2000)
 Snow (2002)
 Feel Euphoria (2003)
 Octane (2005)
 Spock's Beard (2006)
 X (2010)
 Brief Nocturnes and Dreamless Sleep (2013)
 The Oblivion Particle (2015)
 Noise Floor (2018)

Solo 

 Makin' Rock (1980)
 Synthesizer (1980)
 Solid Gold (1980)
 Coming Through (2002)
 The Myth Of The Mostrophus (2022)

K² 

 Book Of The Dead (2005)
 Black Garden (2010)

GPS 

 Window To The Soul (2006)

References

External links

Spock's Beard official website
ProgJect website

People from Osaka Prefecture
American musicians of Japanese descent
Living people
1959 births
Japanese keyboardists
Japanese emigrants to the United States
Spock's Beard members
Inside Out Music artists